K-911 is a 1999 American buddy cop comedy film released direct-to-video, a direct-sequel to K-9, and the third installment in the K-9 film series. It was directed by Charles T. Kanganis and stars James Belushi as Detective Michael Dooley.

Synopsis
Det. Dooley and his German Shepherd dog companion Jerry Lee set out to find a murderous man who plans to kill Dooley. During the movie, Jerry Lee becomes tired, and begins to fail doing his normal way of life. They also reluctantly team up with Sergeant Wendy Welles and her Doberman Pinscher, Zeus, who, according to Welles, was trained in the Netherlands and listen to commands in Dutch (although in reality the commands are in German). Eventually, they discover the attempter: a psychotic man named Devon Lane who thought Dooley's wife, Tracy, loved him more than she did her own husband just because she said that he "had talent". He also believes that Dooley was responsible for Tracy's death. Devon attempts to kill Dooley in a climatic showdown and, just in time, Jerry Lee jumps, tackles Devon, and takes him out. Devon is then arrested and Dooley is taken to the hospital for gunshot wounds. The film ends with Jerry Lee and Dooley holding hands while sharing an intimate moment

Cast
 James Belushi as Det. Dooley
 Christine Tucci as Sgt. Welles
 James Handy as Capt. Byers
 Wade Williams as Devon Lane
 Vincent Castellanos as Harry Stripe
 Ron Yuan as Jackie Hammonds
 Denise Dowse as Dr. Perkins
 Mac, Sonto, Reno as Jerry Lee
 Lucan, Taze, Jasmine as Zeus
 Timo Flloko as Johnson

Reception
On Rotten Tomatoes the film has an approval rating of 17% based on reviews from 6 critics.  Susan King of the Los Angeles Times wrote that film "strains credibility", but Mac is a "joy to watch" as Jerry Lee.

Sequel 
A sequel to the film, titled K-9: P.I., was released direct-to-video on July 30, 2002.

References

External links
 
 

1999 films
1999 direct-to-video films
1990s crime comedy films
American crime comedy films
American buddy comedy films
American buddy cop films
Films about dogs
Police comedies
Direct-to-video sequel films
Universal Pictures direct-to-video films
Films directed by Charles T. Kanganis
1990s buddy cop films
Films with screenplays by Gary Scott Thompson
1999 comedy films
1990s English-language films
1990s American films